Ala-Kintaus is a rather small lake of Finland. It belongs to the Kymijoki main catchment area. It is located in municipality of Petäjävesi in the region of Central Finland. It is a part of Jämsä catchment area.

See also
List of lakes in Finland

References

External links 
 

Kymi basin
Lakes of Petäjävesi